Glass Records was a British independent record label which operated from 1981 to 1990, and was resurrected in 2015.

Glass Vintage 1981–1990
Glass was one of the key London-based indie labels of the 1980s. Early releases focused on artists from Northampton (Religious Overdose, Where's Lisse & The Jazz Butcher), and the Midlands (Bron Area & In Embrace). The label released several records by artists having later associations with other London-based indies: Creation Records (The Jazz Butcher and Nikki Sudden & the Jacobites) ; Fire Records (Spacemen 3 and The Perfect Disaster). Glass's mainstay acts were The Pastels, In Embrace and The Jazz Butcher. The label also issued material by Bauhaus member David J, and American punk band The Replacements, and the influential Liverpool Ur-grunge Walkingseeds.

Founder David Barker went on to work for Fire Records, creating the Paperhouse label, taking the Walkingseeds with him, and releasing the first Teenage Fanclub album, then moving to Creation Records for 2 years.

Glass Redux 2015–
Glass Records returned in 2015 as Glass Redux, reissuing some of its catalogue, unreleased material, rarities and new material from associated and former artists on the label. With the exception of 3 LPs for Record Store Day 2018, all these releases are on CD. In 2016, Glass launched the Glass Miniature download only imprint.

Glass Modern 2018–
A new imprint was announced in 2018, Glass Modern, ostensibly for new artists and vinyl reissues from cult figures from the international rock'n'roll underground, past, present and future. The first six releases are
by The Venus Fly Trap (Icon-GLAMCD001) The Froot (Forbidden Froot-GLAMCD002), on CD and Vinyl reissues by David J (Crocodile Tears And The Velvet Cosh-GLAMLP003), The Velvet Crush (In The Presence Of Greatness-GLAMLP004), Thurston Moore (Klangfarbenmelodie.. And The Colorist Strikes Primitiv-GLALP006) and a brand New LP/Cd by David J in collaboration with Detroit PsychRockers Duende: Duende with David J (Oracle Of The Horizontal-GLAMLP005/GLAMCD005)

Glass Records Vintage 1980–1990 discography
Albums may be in LP (GLALP, GLASSLP or GLEX), compact disc (GLACD or GLEXCD), or cassette (GLAMC or GLASSMC) format, with singles listed mainly with the GLASS prefix. Mini-albums are listed as MGLALP. Artefacts with the same title under different catalogue entries refer to the same recording, if releases were not always issued in more than one format, leading to apparent gaps in the series. (Note that the first Glass Records single was actually released in 1980, although at that point there were not intended to be any more, thus 1981 is the year given as the beginning of it as an ongoing record label).

See also
 List of record labels
 List of independent UK record labels

References

 
Record labels based in London
Record labels established in 1981
Record labels disestablished in 1989
Indie rock record labels
British independent record labels